Thompson Falls can refer to:

 Thompson Falls, Montana, a city in Sanders County, Montana, United States
 Nyahururu, a town in Kenya named by British colonists as Thompson Falls
 Thomson's Falls, waterfalls on the Ewaso Ng'iro River in Kenya
 Blaeberry Falls, a waterfall on the Blaeberry River, British Columbia, Canada